Nuevo Vallarta is a planned residential-resort community located in the  Municipality of Bahía de Banderas, in the Mexican state of Nayarit. By automobile, it is about fifteen minutes north of Puerto Vallarta's Licenciado Gustavo Díaz Ordaz International Airport. Nuevo Vallarta receives many tourists from both the United States/Canada and also the United Kingdom. It has many malls and stores that accept payment in Mexican pesos or U.S. dollars.

History
The Mexican federal government began the project over twenty years ago. The community is currently home to luxury villas and estates that include canals lined with tropical gardens, each with private docking piers.

The area also offers new deluxe resort amenities on more than 5 miles of white sandy beach. The marina development features a 3,000-slip state-of-the-art marina and PADI 1-Star Career Development Dive Center. Condominiums are also available to visitors and residents alike.

Between 1980 and 1990, Nuevo Vallarta's population increased from 57,028 to 111,457 inhabitants. A new marina is under construction, and the constructors have fifteen long-term lease programs.

Fauna and climate
In winter, the caguama turtles lay their eggs on the beaches of Nuevo Vallarta. Caguama turtles have been in danger of extinction since 1978. Some people steal the turtle eggs and cook them; the police are trying to stop these illegal acts by taking the turtle eggs to a safe place with biologists and environmentalists who can take care of them.

The climate is as hot (but a little less wet) than in Puerto Vallarta due to the formation of mountains that surround the bay in which both sit -- conveniently protected from most hurricanes.

See also

Municipalities of Nayarit
Valle de Banderas

References

External links

Populated places in Nayarit
Puerto Vallarta